Log Jammer was a log flume ride at Kennywood amusement park in West Mifflin, Pennsylvania, United States. It opened on May 11, 1975, and was manufactured by Arrow Development. The ride was distinctive because of its spillway drop. Although featured on several Arrow flumes, all were eventually removed, with the exception of Log Jammer, making this the last remaining ride with that element. It was one of three water rides at Kennywood, the other two being Pittsburgh Plunge and Raging Rapids. The ride was  permanently closed at the end of the 2017 summer season on September 17, 2017 and removed to make room for Steel Curtain, a roller coaster opening in 2019. There was controversy over the closing of the Log Jammer. Not only was the ride considered iconic, the announcement was given on September 14, 2017, just 3 days before the closing date. Kennywood received minor social media backlash  and online petitions were started in hopes of saving the ride.

The ride
Log Jammer traveled through the wooded areas of Kennywood in the far right corner of the park. It was the park's first million-dollar ride. The ride included two lift hills, a  spillway drop and a  drop down the final chute. One of the ride's notable features was the spillway which included a short uphill section.

References

Kennywood
Amusement rides introduced in 1975